Bay of Plenty Rugby League is the local sporting body responsible for the administration of Rugby league in the Bay of Plenty region of New Zealand. Following the restructuring of the New Zealand Rugby League they are part of the Upper Central Zone along with Waikato Rugby League, Coastline Rugby League and Gisborne Tairawhiti Rugby League.

Previous National Competitions
Between 1994 and 1996, the Bay of Plenty region was represented by the Bay of Plenty Stags in the Lion Red Cup competition.

Lion Red Cup results

Bartercard Premiership results

Bartercard Cup

The Bay of Plenty region has been represented by two separate teams in the Bartercard Cup competition. 
The Ngongotaha Chiefs competed in the 2000 and 2001 seasons. The team is notable for losing the first sixteen matches of the 2001 season, causing the Chiefs to withdraw from the competition six rounds before the completion of the season.
The Waicoa Bay Stallions, a co-operative team involving players from Waikato, Coastline and Bay of Plenty federations, joined the competition in 2004, replacing the Taranaki Wildcats. The team is notable for having former international Tawera Nikau as head coach for their inaugural year. The Stallions folded along with the competition at the end of the 2007 season.

Rugby league in the Bay of Plenty
Rugby league governing bodies in New Zealand